Miami Lakes Educational Center (MLEC), is a vocational-technical training center in Miami Lakes, Florida. It is part of the Miami-Dade County Public Schools system and one of only three area vocational-technical training centers. It is one of two schools in Miami-Dade County, providing adult vocational training in conjunction with a full-service high school. This allows students to attend regular academic classes and technical or vocational training programs during the same day on the same campus.

History
Miami Lakes Educational Center was established in 1998.

Magnet Academies
MLEC has 26 different strands spread among five magnet academies. Although the school is not recognized as a magnet program by Miami-Dade County Public Schools, as it does not receive specialized magnet funding, the school retains the ability to require students to complete an application form, and may admit students from areas outside of traditional school boundaries. Each magnet academy at MLEC has a distinct uniform. The Cambridge Academy is run by Cambridge International Examinations, and includes mandatory AICE and AP classes. A sixth academy, Trade and Industry, was active before having its strands transferred to the Entrepreneurship Academy, until it became its own individual academy once again.

MLEC is a magnet high school, which requires students to be accepted in order to attend. Upon graduation, a student can receive both a high school diploma and a certificate of completion from the vocational training program.

Miami Lakes Educational Center has consistently maintained an "A" grad.

The classes and academies from the list below are taken from the subject selection form for the magnet school.

Demographics
Miami Lakes Educational Center is 81% Hispanic, 13% Black, 5% White non-Hispanic, and 1% Asian.

References

External links
 Official website

Magnet schools in Florida
Miami-Dade County Public Schools high schools
Universities and colleges accredited by the Council on Occupational Education
1998 establishments in Florida
Educational institutions established in 1998